Samassi is a comune (municipality) in the Province of South Sardinia in the Italian region Sardinia, located about  northwest of Cagliari and about  south of Sanluri.

Samassi borders the following municipalities: Furtei, Sanluri, Serramanna, Serrenti.

Demographic evolution

References

External links

 www.comune.samassi.ca.it
 www.samassiweb.it

Cities and towns in Sardinia